Pyrus anatolica is a species of plant in the family Rosaceae. It is endemic to Turkey.

References

anatolica
Endemic flora of Turkey
Near threatened flora of Asia
Taxonomy articles created by Polbot